D. Vitório Maria Francisco de Sousa Coutinho Teixeira de Andrade Barbosa, second Count of Linhares (25 June 1790 – 29 July 1857) was a Portuguese statesman.

Career 
Vitório Maria Francisco de Sousa Coutinho Teixeira de Andrade Barbosa took part in the campaigns in Rio da Prata.

In 1817 was nominated Extraordinary Envoie and Minister at Turin.

In 1835 he took part of the ministry, being in charge of the Portuguese Navy.

In May, he became the second Portuguese Prime Minister.

He was part of the Câmara dos Pares (Chamber of Peers) in Saint Benedict's Parliament.

External links 
Dicionário Histório Português

1790 births
1857 deaths
Prime Ministers of Portugal
18th-century Portuguese people
19th-century Portuguese people
Counts of Linhares
Naval ministers of Portugal
Portuguese nobility